64 Eridani is a single, yellow-white hued star in the constellation Eridanus having variable star designation S Eridani. It is faintly visible to the naked eye with an apparent visual magnitude of 4.77. In addition to its proper motion, it is moving closer to the Sun with a radial velocity of around −9 km/s.

This is an F-type main-sequence star with a stellar classification of F0 V. It is catalogued a low amplitude Delta Scuti variable with a primary period of 0.273 days.  It was originally classified, tentatively, as an RR Lyrae variable of type 'c'.

64 Eridani is spinning rapidly with a projected rotational velocity of 212 km/s. This is giving the star an oblate shape with an equatorial bulge; its equatorial radius is 8% larger than its polar radius. The star is an estimated 644 million years old with 1.5 times the mass of the Sun. It is radiating 80 times the Sun's luminosity from its photosphere at an effective temperature of roughly 7,346 K.

References

F-type main-sequence stars
Delta Scuti variables
RR Lyrae variables
Eridanus (constellation)
Eridani, S
Durchmusterung objects
Eridani, 64
032045
023231
1611